The Anglican Church of St Mary the Virgin in Nether Stowey in the English county of Somerset has a 15th-century tower, with the remainder of the church being rebuilt in 1851 by Richard Carver and Charles Edmund Giles. It is as a Grade II* listed building.

History

Nether Stowey had a small church by the 12th century with a three-bay nave. A gallery was added in the early 17th century. In 1791 a failed attempt was made to enlarge the church, but in 1814 a transept was added.

The parish is part of the Quantock Villages benefice of Aisholt, Enmore, Goathurst, Nether Stowey, Over Stowey and Spaxton within the Diocese of Bath and Wells.

Architecture

The red sandstone church now has a nave, north and south aisles and a chancel with attached vestry. The tower contains six bells which were recast in 1914.

See also  
 List of ecclesiastical parishes in the Diocese of Bath and Wells

References

Grade II* listed buildings in Sedgemoor
Grade II* listed churches in Somerset
Church of England church buildings in Sedgemoor